Stowe's Hill is an elongated hill,  high, located on the eastern edge of Bodmin Moor in the county of Cornwall, England.

Stowe's Hill is a prominent granite ridge located about 1500 metres north of Minions, the highest village in Cornwall. It is dominated by Stowe's Pound, a huge tor enclosure comprising two massive stone-walls. The smaller enclosure surrounds the tors at the southern end of the hill; the larger one encircles the rest of the ridge. At the southern end is a large, disused quarry, but the hill is best known as the site of the Cheesewring, the extraordinary granite formation that gave the quarry its name.

Inside Stowe's Pound are two Bronze Age cairns, a stone round house and over 100 house platforms. The site is thought to be Neolithic or Bronze Age and connected with other settlements and ritual monuments in the vicinity.

References 

Hills of Cornwall
Bodmin Moor